is a 2005 scrolling shooter video game developed by MOSS, licensed by Seibu Kaihatsu, and published by Taito. It is the fourth game in the Raiden series. Raiden III uses the Taito Type X arcade hardware, giving full 3D graphics to the series for the first time. The game was published in the US by UFO Interactive Games, in Europe by 505 Games, and in China by Soft-World International Corporation. An enhanced version, Raiden III x Mikado Maniax, was released in 2023.

Gameplay
Raiden III shares the same mechanics as the previous games in the series, while introducing new mechanics to set it apart from its predecessors. Players are given a new primary weapon, the piercing Proton Laser, and a new missile weapon, the Radar Missile. New mechanics introduced in this game include the Flash Shot multiplier, which increases score the faster an appearing enemy is destroyed, and Double Play, which allows one player to control both ships with one controller. Raiden III is the first game in the series to give the player craft smaller hitboxes. The bombs were changed to deploy instantly and cover the entire screen, as opposed to the earlier games' delayed explosion and smaller area of damage.

The game consists of seven stages of increasing difficulty, with the first three levels taking place on Earth and the last four taking place in space.

Plot
In Raiden III, the Crystals have begun another invasion of Earth. VCD deploys a new model of the Fighting Thunder, the ME-02, to stop the Crystals and save the Earth. The game's ending sequence shows the player's Fighting Thunder craft landing on the wreck of another Fighting Thunder craft, transforming into a Fairy.

Ports

Windows, PlayStation 2 versions
The Windows port of Raiden III was published by Soft-World International corporation. It includes an English translation of the Japanese text. The Windows version was re-released internationally on download services in 2014. The Windows version is a nearly perfect port of the arcade version.

UFO Interactive Games obtained the publishing rights to the PlayStation 2 version of Raiden III and released the game in the US in April 2007.

Mobile phone versions
The Yahoo Mobile, i-mode, EZ-Web versions contain 3 difficulty levels.

Enhanced version
An enhanced version, Raiden III x Mikado Maniax, was released on February 23, 2023 in Japan for the Nintendo Switch, PlayStation 4, PlayStation 5, Xbox One, and Xbox Series X/S. North American release will be on June 6, 2023 and European and Oceania release will be on June 9, 2023.

Related media

The Flash Desire Raiden III Game Capture DVD

The game capture DVD of Raiden III was released on November 2, 2006. The DVD version contains 120 minutes of footage, while the CD version contains 70 minutes. Its features include:
 Contents 01 - Raiden III Normal Mode Capture Image (Kinomoto will not be in charge of playing; it plays back one-coin capture images of the same work from start to the ending).
 Contents 02 - Raiden III Double Play Mode Capture Image (Hattori will be in charge of playing; it plays back 1 coin capture images of the same work from start to the ending).
 Contents 03 - OUT TAKE (other than the score image which is higher than normal mode main part, wonderful phenomenon and income technique, the user records the opening movie).
 Soundtrack CD (see below)

Game-related Tracks
 Shoot like lightning (Opening demo)
 Takeoff with the suffer (Start demo)
 Lightning strikes (Level 1)
 Passing pleasures (Boss)
 Mission accomplishment (Level clear)
 Electric Resistance (Level 2)
 Dawn of sorrow (Level 3)
 A labyrinth of steel (Level 4)
 Intruder (Level 5)
 Invisible menace (Level 6)
 Last fear (Level 7)
 Fairy (Ending)
 Game Over for Raiden I (Game over)
 Carve your name (Name entry)
 Preparations (PS2 Main menu)

References

External links
Raiden III at the official Japanese website of Moss
Taito Raiden III pages: PS2, NESiCAxLive
Raiden III at Cyber Front's website
The Flash Desire Raiden III on the INH Group's website

2005 video games
505 Games games
Arcade video games
Cooperative video games
Mobile games
MOSS (company) games
Multiplayer and single-player video games
NESiCAxLive games
PlayStation 2 games
PlayStation 3 games
PlayStation Network games
UFO Interactive Games games
Vertically scrolling shooters
Video games developed in Japan
Windows games
CyberFront games
Soft-World games